José Hugo Garaycoa Hawkins (2 June 1930 – 27 March 2018) was a Roman Catholic bishop.

Garaycoa Hawkins was born in Peru and was ordained to the priesthood in 1961. He served as titular bishop of Horæa and auxiliary bishop of the Roman Catholic Archdiocese of Lima, Peru, from 1982 to 1991. He then served as Bishop of the Roman Catholic Diocese of Tacna y Moquegua, Peru, from 1991 to 2006.

Notes

1930 births
2018 deaths
20th-century Roman Catholic bishops in Peru
21st-century Roman Catholic bishops in Peru
Roman Catholic bishops of Tacna and Moquegua